Drag: The Musical (Studio Cast Recording) is a concept album written by Alaska Thunderfuck, Ashley Gordon, and Tomas Costanza. It was released on May 13, 2022 by PEG Records, Killingsworth Recording Company, Craft Recordings, and Concord Theatricals. The album features a large ensemble cast including Alaska Thunderfuck, Bob the Drag Queen, Divina de Campo, Ginger Minj, Jujubee, Lagoona Bloo, Peppermint, Monét X Change, Margaret Cho, Fortune Feimster, Michelle Visage, Max von Essen, and Nick Adams. There are plans to adapt the album into a live stage production. "Drag Is Expensive" was released as a single on May 5, 2022.

The show won the 2023 Queerty Award for Live Theater.

Track listing

References

2022 albums
2022 musicals
Alaska Thunderfuck albums
Albums produced by Tomas Costanza
Cast recordings
Concept albums
Concord Music Group albums
Craft Recordings albums
Drag (clothing)-related musicals
Producer Entertainment Group albums